(born January 31, 1987) is a Japanese philosopher. He is an associate professor at the University of Tokyo. Saito works on ecology and political economy from a Marxist perspective. His latest bestseller, Capital in the Anthropocene, has been credited for inspiring a resurgence of interest in Marxist thought in Japan.

Early life and education 
After graduating from Shiba Junior & Senior High School (芝中学校・芝高等学校), a private school in Tokyo, Saito studied at first at the University of Tokyo (UT) for three months and voluntarily withdrew from the UT to enroll Wesleyan University, Connecticut from 2005 to 2009 as a Freeman Asian Scholarship recipient. He later began his master's studies at the Free University of Berlin in 2009, and then completed his doctorate at the Humboldt University of Berlin.

In 2016, Saito published the book Nature versus Capital. Marx's Ecology in his Unfinished Critique of Capitalism, which is based on his doctoral dissertation. In it, he performs the reconstruction of Karl Marx's ecological critique of capitalism, in which he draws on extensive manuscripts and excerpts from Marx's estate.

Saito co-edited Volume 18 of Division Four of the Marx-Engels-Gesamtausgabe, which was published in 2019. Work on this book also informed his dissertation, which he completed at the Humboldt University of Berlin. Andreas Arndt was his doctoral advisor. In 2017, the English-language version of his book was published, and in 2020 he was awarded the JSPS Prize for it by the Japan Society for the Promotion of Science. Furthermore, in 2018 Saito won the Deutscher Memorial Prize for Marxist Research named after Isaac Deutscher, holding the distinction as the first Japanese and youngest person to receive the award.

Saito was subsequently a visiting scholar at the University of California, Santa Barbara, and from 2017 to March 2022 he was an associate professor at Osaka Metropolitan University. He was made an associate professor at the University of Tokyo in April 2022.

His 2020 published volume Capital in the Anthropocene became an unexpected bestseller in Japan, selling over 250,000 copies by May 2021, sales of which rose to more than 500,000 by mid-2022.

In February 2023 he published Marx in the Anthropocene. Towards the Idea of Degrowth Communism.

Publications (selected) 
 Karl Marx's Ecosocialism: Capital, Nature, and the Unfinished Critique of Political Economy, Monthly Review Press, 2017.
 , Shueisha, 2020.
 Marx in the Anthropocene. Towards the Idea of Degrowth Communism, Cambridge University Press, 2023.

See also
 Anthropocene

References

Living people
1987 births
Marxist theorists
Deutscher Memorial Prize winners
Academic staff of Osaka City University
Academic staff of the University of Tokyo
Japanese Marxists
Wesleyan University alumni
Wesleyan University people